The Pecos Expedition was an exploratory United States military event in Texas. It began April 16, 1859, and ended August 17, 1859.

References

History of Texas
1859 in Texas
1859 in military history